National Bank of Ukraine or NBU is the central bank of Ukraine – a government body responsible for unified state policy in the field of country's monetary circulation, including strengthening of the national currency unit, hryvnia. The National Bank of Ukraine employs over 12,000 people, making it one of the leading banks. It regulates and supervises activities, functions and legal status of government and commercial banks based on principles of the Constitution of Ukraine and the law of Ukraine.

History

Banking in Ukraine traces its history back to 1918 when on 22 December 1917, the Central Council of Ukraine adopted a law "On transformation of the Kyiv office of the Russian State Bank into the Ukrainian State Bank". The law united all offices of the former State bank, Noble Land Bank, and Peasant Land Bank. At the same time there existed a decree of the Central Executive Committee of Ukraine about the nationalization of banks since 14 December 1917. On 5 January 1918, the Ukrainian State Bank started to issue its own money. On 10 August 1918, there was signed a statute on the Ukrainian State Bank. On 23 August 1918, there was established the State Land Bank.

At the end of World War I, Ukraine became occupied by a new Russian regime – Bolsheviks. Bolshevist Russia adopted a law of War Communism which discontinued use of any financial institutions. However, in 1921 across Ukraine started to be established State Banks of the Russian SFSR which later were transformed into the Central Bank of the USSR.

In the 1980's, before the fall of the Soviet Union and during the times of perestroika, the National Bank of Ukraine was a republican branch of the Central Bank of the USSR, while there were registered number of banks with various status. There were over 15 banks of ministerial status, over 20 banks of state/cooperative institutions, Moscow banks in Ukraine, banks with state status. Officially, the National Bank of Ukraine acted as the Central Bank of Ukraine since early 1991. Like institutions of many newly independent nations, it faced dire financial straits during the 1990s, leading to a prolonged period of hyperinflation.

On 20 March 1991, the Verkhovna Rada (parliament) of Ukraine adopted the resolution "On Banks and Banking Activity", which became Law on May 1. The resolution declared ownership by the Ukrainian SSR of the Ukrainian Republican Bank of the State Bank of the USSR (later National Bank of Ukraine), the Ukrainian Republican Bank of the State Commercial Industrial-Constructional Bank of the USSR "Ukrprombudbank", the Ukrainian Republican Bank of the Savings Bank of the USSR, and the Ukrainian Republican Bank of the ForeignEconomBank of the USSR as well as the Ukrainian Republican Department of Encashment of the State Bank of the USSR.

In late February/early March 2022, following the declaration of martial law on 24 February 2022, the National Bank of Ukraine took the extraordinary step of creating and promoting two separate accounts to receive donations (domestic and international) in their response to the Russian invasion of Ukraine: one account is to support the Ukrainian military, and the other account is to support the general populace with humanitarian assistance. On 5 March 2022, the NBU reported having raised "more than UAH 10 billion" (roughly USD 350 million) for military and humanitarian aid.

Legal status and structure

The legal status of the National Bank of Ukraine and the principles of its organization and activities are determined by the Constitution of Ukraine and the Law of Ukraine "On the National Bank of Ukraine".

The National Bank of Ukraine is a legal entity with separated property, which is the object of the state property. Its authorized capital amounts to UAH 100 million and is the state-owned property which is in the full economic competence of the National Bank.

According to Article 99 of the Constitution of Ukraine, adopted in 1996, the main function of the country's central bank is to ensure stability of monetary unit – the Hryvnia (Ukrainian's national currency). To carry out its main function, the National Bank shall foster the stability of the banking system and, within its competence, the price stability.

According to the Law of Ukraine "On the National Bank of Ukraine", the National Bank is the central bank of Ukraine, a specific central body of the state administration, its issuing center which pursue common state policy in money circulation, credit, strengthening of monetary unit; it coordinates functioning of the banking system in general; determines exchange rate of the monetary unit against foreign currencies. The National Bank determines a kind of bank notes, their denomination, distinctive features and their protection system. The National Bank of Ukraine ensures the accumulation and custody of the gold and currency reserves and the conduction of transactions with them and the banking metals. The National Bank of Ukraine sets up the order of determining a discount rate and other interest rates; it gives permission for commercial banks' registration and licenses banking business; determines the standard of emergency funds for commercial banks and other financial and credit institutions.

The National Bank of Ukraine has the power to initiate legislation. Resolutions of the NBU becoming valid just by publishing on their homepage www.bank.gov.ua. Decisions of the NBU may be just appealed at court due to Art.74 of the Law about the National Bank, however, courts may not suspend resolutions during the investigation of appeals, just by court sentences.

The National Bank of Ukraine is governed by the Head of the National Bank of Ukraine and its directory, while its functions are coordinated by the Council of the National Bank of Ukraine. The council consists of 15 members including the Head of the National Bank as the ex officio position. The other members of the council are appointed by an equal quota of seven members from the President of Ukraine and the Verkhovna Rada (Ukraine's national parliament). A Council's meeting is valid if at least six members are present.

Functions

According to the Constitution of Ukraine, the main function of the National Bank of Ukraine (NBU) is to ensure the stability of Ukraine's monetary unit (the hryvnia). To carry this out, the National Bank fosters the stability of the banking system and, within its competence, price stability.

Due to Art.51 of the law about the National Bank of Ukraine, the NBU is accountable for its activities to the Verkhovna Rada (the parliament of Ukraine), the President of Ukraine and the Cabinet of Ministers of Ukraine.

All registered banks in Ukraine are member of the Deposit Guarantee Funds, which guarantees deposits up to 200.000 UAH per person and bank in case of insolvency. The Oshadnybank is excluded from this fund because Ukraine guarantees their deposits directly.

Banks are divided by the National Bank into four categories depending on their capitals (for intensity of banking supervision). 
There are a couple of big banks owned through off-shore companies. However, since 2016 all bank owner-structures had to be published till the last physical person to the National Bank of Ukraine to enforce the Anti-money-laundering and -tax-evasion-policy of the NBU.

Governors of the National Bank of Ukraine
The Governor of the National Bank of Ukraine is dismissed and appointed by the Verkhovna Rada (Ukraine's parliament). The President of Ukraine nominates a candidate before she/he can obtain a parliamentary approval. The President (also) submits to the Verkhovna Rada the draft resolution on the dismissal of the Governor.

Since the bank's establishment, the following statesmen were the Governors of the National Bank of Ukraine (initially the title of the position was the Chairman of the Board of the National Bank of Ukraine)

Commemorative coins
The national Bank of Ukraine offers a broad scale of commemorative and bullion coins and numismatic products, which are being sold primarily (2/3 of production) by the branches of NBU and 1/3 by state banks (Oshadnybank and Ukrgasbank).

See also

National Bank of Ukraine building
Ministry of Finance (Ukraine)
Banking in Ukraine
List of banks in Ukraine

References

Sources
 Dushkevych, N. and V. Zelenyuk (2007) "Banking in Ukraine: Changes Looming?" Beyond Transition Newsletter 17:2, (The Newsletter About Reforming Economies, THE WORLD BANK, 2007).
 Про банки і банківську діяльність. Law of Ukraine. March 20, 1991.
 Про банки і банківську діяльність. Law of Ukraine. Accessed on August 17, 2006.
 Про Національний банк України. Law of Ukraine. Accessed on August 17, 2006.

External links

 
 Вся правда про фінансову систему СРСР (Ч.4 Перебудова) (All truth about financial system of the USSR (P.4: Perestroika))
 Melnyk, P., Tarahul, L., Hordei, O. Banking system of Russia. Banking systems of foreign countries (handbook). 2010.
 Kostyuchenko, O. Creation and evolution of banking in Ukraine. Banking Law. 2011.

 
Banks established in 1991
Ukraine
Banks of Ukraine
Independent agencies of the Ukrainian government
Financial regulatory authorities of Ukraine
1991 establishments in the Soviet Union
Government finances in Ukraine
Ukrainian companies established in 1991
Institutions with the title of National in Ukraine